Riftia pachyptila, commonly known as the giant tube worm and less commonly known as the Giant beardworm, is a  marine invertebrate in the phylum Annelida (formerly grouped in phylum Pogonophora and Vestimentifera) related to tube worms commonly found in the intertidal and pelagic zones. R. pachyptila lives on the floor of the Pacific Ocean near hydrothermal vents, the vents provide a natural ambient temperature in their environment ranging from 2 to 30 °C, at the same time it can tolerate extremely high hydrogen sulfide levels.

Its common name "giant tube worm" is, however, also applied to the largest living species of shipworm, Kuphus polythalamius, which despite the name "worm", is a bivalve mollusc rather than an annelid.

Discovery
R. pachyptila was discovered in 1977 on an expedition of the American bathyscaphe DSV Alvin to the Galápagos Rift led by geologist Jack Corliss. The discovery was unexpected, as the team was studying hydrothermal vents and no biologists were included in the expedition. Many of the species found living near hydrothermal vents during this expedition had never been seen before.

At the time, the presence of thermal springs near the midoceanic ridges was known. Further research uncovered aquatic life in the area, despite the high temperature (around 350–380 °C).

Many samples were collected, for example, bivalves, polychaetes, large crabs, and R. pachyptila. It was the first time that species was observed.

Development
R. pachyptila develops from a free-swimming, pelagic, nonsymbiotic trochophore larva, which enters juvenile (metatrochophore) development, becoming sessile, and subsequently acquiring symbiotic bacteria.  The symbiotic bacteria, on which adult worms depend for sustenance, are not present in the gametes, but are acquired from the environment through the skin in a process akin to an infection. The digestive tract transiently connects from a mouth at the tip of the ventral medial process to a foregut, midgut, hindgut, and anus and was previously thought to have been the method by which the bacteria are introduced into adults.  After symbionts are established in the midgut, they undergo substantial remodelling and enlargement to become the trophosome, while the remainder of the digestive tract has not been detected in adult specimens.

Body structure

Isolating the vermiform body from white chitinous tube, a small difference exists from the classic three subdivisions typical of phylum Pogonophora: the prosoma, the mesosoma, and the metasoma.

 
The first body region is the vascularized branchial plume, which is bright red due to the presence of hemoglobin that contain up to 144 globin chains (each presumably including associated heme structures). These tube worm hemoglobins are remarkable for carrying oxygen in the presence of sulfide, without being inhibited by this molecule, as hemoglobins in most other species are. The plume provides essential nutrients to bacteria living inside the trophosome. If the animal perceives a threat or is touched, it retracts the plume and the tube is closed due to the obturaculum, a particular operculum that protects and isolates the animal from the external environment.

The second body region is the vestimentum, formed by muscle bands, having a winged shape, and it presents the two genital openings at the end. The heart, extended portion of dorsal vessel, enclose the vestimentum.

In the middle part, the trunk or third body region, is full of vascularized solid tissue, and includes body wall, gonads, and the coelomic cavity. Here is located also the trophosome, spongy tissue where  a billion symbiotic, thioautotrophic bacteria and sulfur granules are found. Since the mouth, digestive system, and anus are missing, the survival of R. pachyptila is dependent on this mutualistic symbiosis. This process, known as chemosynthesis, was recognized within the trophosome by Colleen Cavanaugh.

The soluble hemoglobins, present in the tentacles, are able to bind O2 and H2S, which are necessary for chemosynthetic bacteria. Due to the capillaries, these compounds are absorbed by bacteria. During the chemosynthesis, the mitochondrial enzyme rhodanase catalyzes the disproportionation reaction of the thiosulfate anion S2O32- to sulfur S and sulfite SO32- . The R. pachyptila’s bloodstream is responsible for absorption of the  O2 and nutrients such as carbohydrates.

Nitrate and nitrite are toxic, but are required for biosynthetic processes. The chemosynthetic bacteria within the trophosome convert nitrate to ammonium ions, which then are available for production of amino acids in the bacteria, which are in turn released to the tube worm. To transport nitrate to the bacteria, R. pachyptila concentrates nitrate in its blood, to a concentration 100 times more concentrated than the surrounding water. The exact mechanism of R. pachyptila’s ability to withstand and concentrate nitrate is still unknown.

In the posterior part, the fourth body region, is the opistosome, which anchors the animal to the tube and is used for the storage of waste from bacterial reactions.

Symbiosis 
The discovery of bacterial invertebrate chemoautotrophic symbiosis, particularly in vestimentiferan tubeworms R. pachyptila and then in vesicomyid clams and mytilid mussels revealed the chemoautotrophic potential of the hydrothermal vent tube worm. Scientists discovered a remarkable source of nutrition that helps to sustain the conspicuous biomass of invertebrates at vents. Many studies focusing on this type of symbiosis revealed the presence of chemoautotrophic, endosymbiotic, sulfur-oxidizing bacteria mainly in R. pachyptila,  which inhabits extreme environments and is adapted to the particular composition of the mixed volcanic and sea waters. This special environment is filled with inorganic metabolites, essentially carbon, nitrogen, oxygen, and sulfur. In its adult phase, R. pachyptila lacks a digestive system. To provide its energetic needs, it retains those dissolved inorganic nutrients (sulfide, carbon dioxide, oxygen, nitrogen) into its plume and transports them through a vascular system to the trophosome, which is suspended in paired coelomic cavities and is where the intracellular symbiotic bacteria are found. The trophosome  is a soft tissue that runs through almost the whole length of the tube's coelom. It retains a large number of bacteria on the order of 109 bacteria per gram of fresh weight. Bacteria in the trophosome are retained inside bacteriocytes, thereby having no contact with the external environment. Thus, they rely on R. pachyptila for the assimilation of nutrients needed for the array of metabolic reactions they employ and for the excretion of waste products of carbon fixation pathways. At the same time, the tube worm depends completely on the microorganisms for the byproducts of their carbon fixation cycles that are needed for its growth.

Initial evidence for a chemoautotrophic symbiosis in R. pachyptila came from microscopic and biochemical analyses showing Gram-negative bacteria packed within a highly vascularized organ in the tubeworm trunk called the trophosome. Additional analyses involving  stable isotope, enzymatic, and physiological characterizations confirmed that the end symbionts of R. pachyptila oxidize reduced-sulfur compounds to synthesize ATP for use in autotrophic carbon fixation through the Calvin cycle. The host tubeworm enables the uptake and transport of the substrates required for thioautotrophy, which are HS−, O2, and CO2, receiving back a portion of the organic matter synthesized by the  symbiont population. The adult tubeworm,  given its inability to feed on particulate matter and its entire dependency on its symbionts for nutrition, the bacterial population is then the primary source of carbon acquisition for the symbiosis. Discovery of bacterial–invertebrate chemoautotrophic symbioses, initially in vestimentiferan tubeworms and then in vesicomyid clams and mytilid mussels, pointed to an even more remarkable source of nutrition sustaining the invertebrates at vents.

Endosymbiosis with chemoautotrophic bacteria 
A wide range of bacterial diversity is associated with symbiotic relationships with R. pachyptila. Many bacteria belong to the phylum Campylobacterota (formerly class Epsilonproteobacteria) as supported by the recent discovery in 2016 of the new species Sulfurovum riftiae belonging to the phylum Campylobacterota, family Helicobacteraceae isolated from R. pachyptila collected from the East Pacific Rise. Other symbionts belong to the class Delta-, Alpha- and Gammaproteobacteria. The Candidatus Endoriftia persephone (Gammaproteobacteria) is a facultative R. pachyptila symbiont and has been shown to be a mixotroph, thereby exploiting both Calvin Benson cycle and reverse TCA cycle (with an unusual ATP citrate lyase) according to availability of carbon resources and whether it is free living in the environment or inside a eukaryotic host. The bacteria apparently prefer a heterotrophic lifestyle when carbon sources are available.

Evidence based on 16S rRNA analysis affirms that R. pachyptila chemoautotrophic bacteria belong to two different clades: Gammaproteobacteria and Campylobacterota (e.g. Sulfurovum riftiae) that get energy from the oxidation of inorganic sulfur compounds such as hydrogen sulfide (H2S, HS−, S2-) to synthesize ATP for carbon fixation via the Calvin cycle. Unfortunately, most of these bacteria are still uncultivable. Symbiosis works so that R. pachyptila provides nutrients such as HS−, O2, CO2 to bacteria, and in turn it receives organic matter from them. Thus, because of lack of a digestive system, R. pachyptila depends entirely on its bacterial symbiont  to survive.

In the first step of sulfide-oxidation, reduced sulfur (HS−) passes from the external environment into R. pachyptila blood, where, together with O2, it is bound by hemoglobin, forming the complex Hb-O2-HS− and then it is transported to the trophosome, where bacterial symbionts reside. Here, HS− is oxidized to elemental sulfur (S0) or to sulfite (SO32-).

In the second step, the symbionts make sulfite-oxidation by the "APS pathway", to get ATP. In this biochemical pathway, AMP reacts with sulfite in the presence of the enzyme APS reductase, giving APS (adenosine 5'-phosphosulfate). Then, APS reacts with the enzyme ATP sulfurylase in presence of pyrophosphate (PPi) giving ATP (substrate-level phosphorylation) and sulfate (SO42-) as end products. In formulas:

 AMP + SO3^2- ->[APSreductase] APS
 APS  +  PPi  ->[ATP sulfurylase] ATP + SO4^2-

The electrons released during the entire sulfide-oxidation process enter in an electron transport chain, yielding a proton gradient that produces ATP (oxydative phosphorylation). Thus, ATP generated from oxidative phosphorylation and ATP produced by substrate-level phosphorylation become available for CO2 fixation in Calvin cycle, whose presence has been demonstrated by the presence of two key enzymes of this pathway: phosphoribulokinase and RubisCO.

To support this unusual metabolism, R. pachyptila has to absorb all the substances necessary for both sulfide-oxidation and carbon fixation, that is: HS−, O2 and CO2 and other fundamental bacterial nutrients such as N and P. This means that the tubeworm must be able to access both oxic and anoxic areas.

Oxidation of reduced sulfur compounds requires the presence of oxidized reagents such as oxygen and nitrate. Hydrothermal vents are characterized by conditions of high hypoxia. In hypoxic conditions, sulfur-storing organisms start producing hydrogen sulfide. Therefore, the production of in H2S in anaerobic conditions is common among thiotrophic symbiosis. H2S can be damaging for some physiological processes as it inhibits the activity of cytochrome c oxidase, consequentially impairing oxidative phosphorilation. In R. pachyptila the production of hydrogen sulfide starts after 24h of hypoxia. In order to avoid physiological damage some animals, including Riftia pachyptila are able to bind H2S to haemoglobin in the blood to eventually expel it in the surrounding environment.

Carbon fixation and organic carbon assimilation 
Unlike metazoans, which respire carbon dioxide as a waste product, R. pachyptila-symbiont association has a demand for a net uptake of CO2 instead, as a cnidarian-symbiont associations.

Ambient deep-sea water contains an abundant amount of inorganic carbon in the form of bicarbonate HCO3−, but it is actually the chargeless form of inorganic carbon, CO2, that is easily diffusible across membranes. The low partial pressures of CO2 in the deep-sea environment is due to the seawater alkaline pH and the high solubility of CO2, yet the pCO2 of the blood of R. pachyptila may be as much as two orders of magnitude greater than the pCO2 of deep-sea water.

CO2 partial pressures are transferred to the vicinity of vent fluids due to the enriched inorganic carbon content of vent fluids and their lower pH. CO2 uptake in the worm is enhanced by the higher pH of its blood (7.3–7.4), which favors the bicarbonate ion and thus promotes a steep gradient across which CO2 diffuses into the vascular blood of the plume. The facilitation of CO2 uptake by high environmental pCO2 was first inferred based on measures of elevated blood and coelomic fluid pCO2 in tubeworms, and was subsequently demonstrated through incubations of intact animals under various pCO2 conditions.

Once CO2 is fixed by the symbionts, it must be assimilated by the host tissues. The supply of fixed carbon to the host is  transported via organic molecules from the trophosome in the hemolymph, but the relative importance of translocation and symbiont digestion is not yet known. Studies proved that within 15 min, the label first appears in symbiont-free host tissues, and that indicates a significant amount of release of organic carbon immediately after fixation. After 24 h, labeled carbon is clearly evident in the epidermal tissues of the body wall. Results of the pulse-chase autoradiographic experiments  were also evident with ultrastructural evidence for digestion of symbionts in the peripheral regions of the trophosome lobules.

Sulfide acquisition 
In deep-sea hydrothermal vents, sulfide and oxygen are present in different areas. Indeed, the reducing fluid of hydrothermal vents is rich in sulfide, but poor in oxygen, whereas sea water is richer in dissolved oxygen. Moreover, sulfide is immediately oxidized by dissolved oxygen to form partly, or totally, oxidized sulfur compounds like thiosulfate (S2O32-)  and ultimately  sulfate (SO42-), respectively less, or no longer, usable for microbial oxidation metabolism. This causes the substrates to be less available for microbial activity, thus bacteria are constricted to compete with oxygen to get their nutrients. In order to avoid this issue, several microbes have evolved to make symbiosis with eukaryotic hosts. In fact, R. pachyptila is able to cover the oxic and anoxic areas  to get both sulfide and oxygen thanks to its hemoglobin that can bind sulfide reversibly and apart from oxygen by means of two cysteine residues, and then transport it to the trophosome, where bacterial metabolism can occur.

Symbiont acquisition 
The acquisition of a symbiont by a host can occur in these ways:

Environmental transfer (symbiont acquired from a free-living population in the environment)
 Vertical transfer (parents transfer symbiont to offspring via eggs)
 Horizontal transfer (hosts that share the same environment)

Evidence suggests that R. pachyptila acquires its symbionts through its environment. In fact, 16S rRNA gene analysis showed that vestimentiferan tubeworms belonging to three different genera: Riftia, Oasisia, and Tevnia, share the same bacterial symbiont phylotype.

This proves that R. pachyptila takes its symbionts from a free-living bacterial population in the environment. Other studies also support this thesis, because analyzing R. pachyptila eggs, 16S rRNA belonging to the symbiont was not found, showing that the bacterial symbiont is not transmitted by vertical transfer.

Another proof to support the environmental transfer comes from several studies conducted in the late 1990s. PCR was used to detect and identify a R. pachyptila symbiont gene whose sequence was very similar to the fliC gene that encodes some primary protein subunits (flagellin) required for flagellum synthesis. Analysis showed that R. pachyptila symbiont has at least one gene needed for flagellum synthesis. Hence, the question arose as to the purpose of the flagellum. Flagellar motility would be useless for a bacterial symbiont transmitted vertically, but if the symbiont came from the external environment, then a flagellum would be essential to reach the host organism and to colonize it. Indeed, several symbionts use this method to colonize eukaryotic hosts.

Thus, these results confirm the environmental transfer of R. pachyptila symbiont.

Reproduction 
R. pachyptila is a dioecious vestimentiferan. Individuals of this species are sessile and are found clustered together around deep-sea hydrothermal vents of the East Pacific Rise and the Galapagos Rift. The size of a patch of individuals surrounding a vent is within the scale of tens of metres.

The male's spermatozoa are thread-shaped and are composed of three distinct regions: the acrosome (6 μm), the nucleus (26 μm) and the tail (98 μm). Thus, the single spermatozoa is about 130 μm long overall, with a diameter of 0.7 μm, which becomes narrower near the tail area, reaching 0.2 μm. The sperm is arranged into an agglomeration of around 340-350 individual spermatozoa that create a torch-like shape. The cup part is made up of acrosomes and nucleus, while the handle is made up by the tails. The spermatozoa in the package are held together by fibrils. Fibrils also coat the package itself to ensure cohesion.

The large ovaries of females run within the gonocoel along the entire length of the trunk and are ventral to the trophosome. Eggs at different maturation stages can be found in the middle area of the ovaries, and depending on their developmental stage, are referred to as: oogonia, oocytes, and follicular cells. When the oocytes mature, they acquire protein and lipid yolk granules.

Males release their sperm into sea water. While the released agglomerations of spermatozoa, referred to as spermatozeugmata, do not remain intact for more than 30 seconds in laboratory conditions, they may maintain integrity for longer periods of time in specific hydrothermal vent conditions. Usually, the spermatozeugmata swim into the female's tube. Movement of the cluster is conferred by the collective action of each spermatozoon moving independently. Reproduction has also been observed involving only a single spermatozoon reaching the female's tube. Generally, fertilization in R. pachyptila is considered internal. However, some argue that, as the sperm is released into sea water and only afterwards reaches the eggs in the oviducts, it should be defined as internal-external.

R. pachyptila is completely dependent on the production of volcanic gases and the presence of sulfide-oxidizing bacteria. Therefore, its metapopulation distribution is profoundly linked to volcanic and tectonic activity that create active hydrothermal vent sites with a patchy and ephemeral distribution. The distance between active sites along a rift or adjacent segments can be very high, reaching hundreds of km. This raises the question regarding larval dispersal. R. pachytpila is capable of larval dispersal across distances of 100 to 200 km and cultured larvae show to be viable for 38 days. Though dispersal is considered to be effective, the genetic variability observed in R. pachyptila metapopulation is low compared to other vent species. This may be due to high extinction events and colonization events, as R. pachyptila is one of the first species to colonize a new active site.

The endosymbionts of R. pachyptila are not passed to the fertilized eggs during spawning, but are acquired later during the larval stage of the vestimentiferan worm. R. pachyptila planktonic larvae that are transported through sea-bottom currents until they reach active hydrothermal vents sites, are referred to as trophocores. The trophocore stage lacks endosymbionts, which are acquired once larvae settle in a suitable environment and substrate. Free-living bacteria found in the water column are ingested randomly and enter the worm through a ciliated opening of the branchial plume. This opening is connected to the trophosome through a duct that passes through the brain. Once the bacteria are in the gut, the ones that are beneficial to the individual, namely sulfide- oxidizing strains are paghocytized by epithelial cells found in the midgut are then retained. Bacteria that do not represent possible endosymbionts are digested. This raises questions as to how R. pachyptila manages to discern between essential and nonessential bacterial strains. The worm's ability to recognise a beneficial strain, as well as preferential host-specific infection by bacteria have been both suggested as being the drivers of this phenomenon.

Growth rate and age
R. pachyptila has the fastest growth rate of any known marine invertebrate. These organisms have been known to colonize a new site, grow to sexual maturity, and increase in length to 4.9 feet (1.5 m) in less than two years.

Because of the peculiar environment in which R. pachyptila thrives, this species differs greatly from other deep-sea species that do not inhabit hydrothermal vents sites; the activity of diagnostic enzymes for glycolysis, citric acid cycle and transport of electrons in the tissues of R. pachyptila is very similar to the activity of these enzymes in the tissues of shallow-living animals. This contrasts with the fact that deep-sea species usually show very low metabolic rates, which in turn suggests that low water temperature and high pressure in the deep sea do not necessarily limit the metabolic rate of animals and that hydrothermal vents sites display characteristics that are completely different from the surrounding environment, thereby shaping the physiology and biological interactions of the organisms living in these sites.

See also 
 Siboglinidae
 Lamellibrachia
 List of long-living organisms
 Maximum life span
 Pompeii worm
 Chemosynthesis

References

External links 

 
 Giant Tube Worm page at the Smithsonian
 Podcast on Giant Tube Worm at the Encyclopedia of Life
 http://www.seasky.org/monsters/sea7a1g.html
 Introduction to the Pogonophora: Weird tube worms of the deepest seas
 https://web.archive.org/web/20090408022512/http://www.ocean.udel.edu/deepsea/level-2/creature/tube.html

Polychaetes

Fauna of the Pacific Ocean
Animals described in 1981
Chemosynthetic symbiosis
Animals living on hydrothermal vents